K2-22b (also known as EPIC 201637175 b) is an exoplanet 801 ly from Earth, rapidly orbiting the red dwarf K2-22 with an orbital period of 9.145872 hours. It has a mass below 445 Me and a radius below 2.5 Re. The planet was not detected in the K2 photometry. K2 photometry reveals the presence of an anomalous light curve consistent with evaporation of dust from the planet. This dust forms a tail both ahead and behind the planet, similar to some comets in the Solar System. The evaporation of this dust requires a low surface gravity from the host planet, implying it is a low mass, "Mars, Mercury, or even lunar sized bodies with surface gravities of 1/6 to 1/3 that of Earth are to be preferred."

The survey in 2020 has failed to validate the existence of the planet, although did not claim it to be a false positive.

The observation of planetary system in 2021 has failed to detect the planet itself, placing an upper limit of 0.71 on its size. With the observed mass loss rate, the probable planet mass is 0.02, and the planet will be gone in 21 million years in future.

See also

List of exoplanet extremes

References

Exoplanets discovered in 2015
Transiting exoplanets
2
Leo (constellation)